The Daniel Brooks House is a historic First Period house located at 19 Brooks Road in Lincoln, Massachusetts.

Description and history 
The oldest portion of this -story timber-frame house was built c. 1695 by Daniel Brooks. Its interior has retained many of its early 18th century features, including exposed beams, wide pine floorboards, and unbaked bricks used as insulation between inner and outer wall coverings. Eleazar Brooks, a descendant, was a prominent local politician at the time of the American Revolution.

The house was listed on the National Register of Historic Places on October 25, 1973.

See also
National Register of Historic Places listings in Middlesex County, Massachusetts

References

External links

Wicked Local Lincoln article by Barbara Rhines

Houses completed in 1695
Houses on the National Register of Historic Places in Middlesex County, Massachusetts
Brooks House, Daniel
1695 establishments in Massachusetts